Jesu / Sun Kil Moon is a collaborative studio album by American indie folk act Sun Kil Moon and British experimental act Jesu, released on January 21, 2016 on Caldo Verde Records and Rough Trade. The album also features guest musicians Will Oldham (a.k.a. Bonnie "Prince" Billy), members of Low, Rachel Goswell of Slowdive, and Isaac Brock of Modest Mouse. Jesu and Sun Kil Moon including drummer Steve Shelley of Sonic Youth played six shows in February and March 2016 to support the album.

Background
Mark Kozelek first hinted at the collaborative album in an interview in the January 2015 issue of Uncut magazine, and officially announced on April 27, 2015, by Jesu frontman Justin Broadrick via Twitter. In the tweet Broadrick said, "A lot of questions about a new Jesu record, I've been working on it for some time, it's a collaboration LP between Sun Kil Moon and Jesu."

The album grew out of a long-standing relationship between Broadrick and Sun Kil Moon frontman Mark Kozelek. Kozelek first approached Broadrick in 2007 about a release through his label, after being impressed by a live performance in San Francisco. In 2009 Jesu released Opiate Sun through Caldo Verde Records (a record label owned by Kozelek), and later the same year Broadrick interviewed Kozelek for the Caldo Verde website. In 2013, Kozelek covered Broadrick's band Godflesh's song "Like Rats". Broadrick and Godflesh are mentioned in "The Possum", the opening track from Sun Kil Moon's 2015 album Universal Themes.

On October 5, 2015, the track "America's Most Wanted Mark Kozelek and John Dillinger" was made available for streaming; on October 21 the track "Exodus" was available for streaming, pre-orders of the album's CDs were enabled, and Isaac Brock of Modest Mouse was added to the album's guesting musicians. On January 15, 2016, a week before the album's official January 22 release date, the project was available to stream in full on Sun Kil Moon's website.

Critical reception

Jesu/Sun Kil Moon was positively received by critics.

Track listing

Personnel
Musicians
 Mark Kozelek – vocals, nylon string guitar on "Fragile"
 Justin Broadrick – all instruments (on all tracks except "Fragile" and "Exodus")
 Chris Connolly – keyboards on "Exodus"
 Will Oldham – guest vocals on "Fragile"
 Rachel Goswell – guest vocals on "Father's Day", "Exodus", and "Beautiful You"
 Alan Sparhawk – guest vocals on "Exodus"
 Mimi Parker – guest vocals on "Exodus"
 Isaac Brock – guest vocals on "Beautiful You"

Production
 Produced by Justin Broadrick and Mark Kozelek
 Recorded by Justin Broadrick, Will Chason, and Nathan Winter
 Additional recording by Steve Clarke and Jeremy Sherrer
 Mixed by Will Chason and Nathan Winter
 Cover photo of Mark Kozelek and Macha Kouznetsova by Steve Shelley
 Back cover photo by Mark Kozelek
 Inside photo of Broadrick and Kozelek by Mike Stevens
 Sleeve design by Brian Azer at Et Cetera

References

2016 albums
Sun Kil Moon albums
Jesu (band) albums
Caldo Verde Records albums
Collaborative albums